Coat of arms of Tallinn represents Tallinn, the capital city of Estonia.

Greater coat of arms
The full, or greater, coat of arms of Tallinn depicts three blue marching, forward-facing (passant gardant) lions crowned with golden crowns on a golden shield. The shield is topped with a silver helmet placed affronté, with closed visor and red lining. The mantling is blue and golden. A golden neck chain featuring a stone hangs around the helmet's neck. The helmet's crest features a golden crown from which a woman protrudes, clad in a red robe and wearing a golden crown, arms crossed before her chest. 

The three lions are one of the oldest Estonian symbols. It has been used since the 13th century and derives from the arms of Danish king Valdemar II, then ruler of northern Estonia.

Lesser coat of arms
The lesser coat of arms of Tallinn features a silver cross on a red background, depicting the Dannebrog cross. It is also the coat of arms of Harju County.

History

The coat of arms of Reval (Tallinn) in the Russian Empire was formally approved by Catherine II on October 4, 1788, by Law No. 16716 "On the Coats of Arms of the Cities of the Riga, Reval and Vyborg Gubernias and the Olonets Provincial Cities". Description of the arms: in a golden field azure leopard lions.

In 1868, under the direction of B.V. Koen in the Armorial Department of the Heraldry Department of the Government of Senta, a draft of the Reval coat of arms was drawn up in accordance with the rules of external decorations: the shield should have been crowned with a golden-crowned crown; behind the shield probably (?) should be placed anchors, tied with Alexander's ribbon.

On December 10 (22) 1877, the first Tallinn city assembly was formed in accordance with the new provincial zemstvo institutions' regulations of 1864 (after the zemstvo reform in the Russian Empire). Until then, the Lübeck law had been legally followed in the Lower town of Reval. On the same day, the city assembly approved the large coat of arms of Reval. Today December 22 is celebrated as the "Day of the City of Tallinn".

After Estonia became an independent country in 1918, the coat of arms of Tallinn was reconfirmed in 1919 in the same form as had been approved in 1877. In this form it can be seen on the painted bas-relief at the Tallinn Town Hall.

In the 1970s to 1980s, a Soviet-style emblem (analogous to coat of arms) was designed by Paul Luhtein. It was a red-blue shield with two transverse waves, on top of which was placed in the middle an image of a golden key with a 5-gang beard and "Old Thomas" in the head.

Gallery

See also
 Flag of Tallinn
 Coat of arms of Estonia

References

Sources
 Tallinn sümboolika linna kodulehel 
 Tallinna sümboolika (suur vapp) 
 Tallinna sümboolika (väike vapp) 
 Taani lõvide salapärane tee Eesti vapile 

Culture in Tallinn
History of Tallinn
Tallinn
Tallinn
Tallinn